Bulbophyllum zebrinum is a species of orchid in the genus Bulbophyllum. It can be found in Indonesia.

References
The Bulbophyllum-Checklist
The Internet Orchid Species Photo Encyclopedia

zebrinum